Obligation is a historic home at Harwood, Anne Arundel County, Maryland, United States. It was begun in 1743 and later enlarged in 1827, to two and one-half stories. The house was built for Thomas Stockett III, and was enlarged to its present configuration during the ownership of his grandson, Joseph Noble Stockett (1779-1858). Dr. Thomas Noble Stockett (1747-1802) was the son of Thomas III, and became a prominent citizen and served as surgeon for the Maryland Line during the American Revolutionary War.

Obligation was listed on the National Register of Historic Places in 1969.

References

External links
, including photo from 1997, at Maryland Historical Trust

Houses on the National Register of Historic Places in Maryland
Houses in Anne Arundel County, Maryland
Houses completed in 1743
National Register of Historic Places in Anne Arundel County, Maryland
1743 establishments in Maryland